Madame Spy is a 1918 American silent comedy spy film directed by Douglas Gerrard and starring Jack Mulhall, Claire Du Brey and Wadsworth Harris.

Cast
 Jack Mulhall as Robert Wesley
 Donna Drew as Phyllis Covington
 Wadsworth Harris as Adm. John Wesley
 George Gebhardt as Hanson 
 Jean Hersholt as Count Von Ornstorff
 Claire Du Brey as Baroness Von Hulda
 Maude Emory as Margaret Wesley

References

Bibliography
James Robert Parish & Michael R. Pitts. The Great Spy Pictures. Scarecrow Press, 1974.

External links
 

1918 films
1910s spy comedy films
1918 comedy films
1910s English-language films
American silent feature films
American spy comedy films
American black-and-white films
Universal Pictures films
Films directed by Douglas Gerrard
1910s American films
Silent American comedy films